Fontainea australis is a rare  rainforest plant from eastern Australia. The common name is southern fontainea. It grows in sub tropical rainforest at low altitudes on basaltic alluvial soils. Distributed from the Wilsons River (New South Wales) to the Tallebudgera Valley in south eastern Queensland.

Description
A shrub or small tree to 5 metres tall. Leaves are 6 to 9 cm long and 2 to 3.5 cm wide, alternate on the stem. Reverse ovate or elliptic in shape with a long leaf tip, and narrow wedge shaped at the leaf base. The leaf stalk are between 5 and 21 mm long, swollen at both ends, and somewhat channelled. Small white flowers appear on panicles flowers December to January. The fruit matures in July, being a red fleshy ovate shaped capsule, 2.3 cm in diameter.

References

australis
Trees of Australia
Malpighiales of Australia
Vulnerable flora of Australia
Flora of New South Wales
Flora of Queensland
Vulnerable biota of Queensland